Shoshana Gershonowitz (1906–1986) was an Israel Defense Forces officer who served as commander of the Women's Corps from 1952 to 1959.

Born as Shoshana Gershom, she immigrated from Russia in her youth, and settled in Jerusalem. She was active at the Haganah.

During WWII she was among the first 66 women to join the Auxiliary Territorial Service, and one of four to become an officer  and retired as a captain.

In 1947 she established the women's unit of the Haganah in Jerusalem.
She served as deputy to Mina Ben-Zvi, IDF Women's Corps first commander.
In 1952 she served as the Nahal's women commander.
Between the years 1952 to 1959 she was promoted to colonel and served as Women's Corps commander in chief, under the direct command of IDF head of manpower, in charge of all IDF women.
Upon leaving the army, she served as attachée for liaison with women's organizations in  Washington, D.C.

She appeared on the May 18, 1958 episode of the quiz show What's My Line? under the name Shoshana Gershom and succeeded in stumping the panel, which was unable to guess her occupation.

References

1906 births
1986 deaths
Female army generals
 
Women in World War II
Israeli female military personnel
Israeli soldiers
Mandatory Palestine military personnel of World War II